Butler High School may refer to:

Butler High School (Augusta, Georgia)
Butler High School (Gainesville, Georgia)
Butler High School (Butler, Missouri)
Butler High School (New Jersey), Butler, New Jersey
Butler High School (Butler, Oklahoma)
Butler High School (Vandalia, Ohio)
Butler High School (Butler, Pennsylvania)
Butler County High School, Morgantown, Kentucky
Butler Traditional High School, Louisville, Kentucky
Candy Butler High School, King City, California
David W. Butler High School, Matthews, North Carolina
S. R. Butler High School, Huntsville, Alabama
Butler College (Perth), Western Australia

See also
Butler College (disambiguation)